ShmooCon is an American hacker convention organized by The Shmoo Group. There are typically 40 different talks and presentations on a variety of subjects related to computer security and cyberculture. Multiple events are held at the convention related to cryptography and computer security such as Shmooganography, Hack Fortress, a locksport village hosted by TOOOL DC, and Ghost in the Shellcode. ShmooCon 2021 was not held in January due to the COVID-19 pandemic. The next event is set for January 20-22, 2023

History
From 2005 to 2010, ShmooCon was held at the Marriott Wardman Park in Washington, D.C.

ShmooCon VII and VII (2011–2012) were held at the Washington Hilton in Washington, D.C.

ShmooCon IX was held at the Hyatt Regency Washington in Washington, D.C.

ShmooCon X and later returned to the Washington Hilton in Washington, D.C.

 ShmooCon I: February 4–6, 2005: ≈ 400 attendees
 ShmooCon II: January 13–15, 2006: ≈ 700 attendees
 ShmooCon III: March 23–25, 2007:  Sold out; > 900 attendees
 ShmooCon IV: February 15–17, 2008: Sold out; > 1200 attendees
 ShmooCon V: February 6–8, 2009: Sold out; > 1600 attendees
 ShmooCon VI: February 5–7, 2010: Sold out; around 1600 attendees
 ShmooCon VII: January 28–30, 2011: Sold out; > 1600 attendees
 ShmooCon VIII: January 27–29, 2012: Sold out; > 1800 attendees
 ShmooCon IX: February 15–17, 2013: Sold out; > 1600 attendees
 ShmooCon X: January 17–19, 2014: Sold out; > 1900 attendees
 ShmooCon XI: January 16–18, 2015: Sold out; > 1900 attendees
 ShmooCon XII: January 19–21, 2016: Sold out; > 1500 attendees
 ShmooCon XIII: January 13–15, 2017: Sold out; ≈ 2200 attendees
 ShmooCon XIV: January 19–21, 2018: Sold out; ≈ 2200 attendees
 ShmooCon XV: January 18–20, 2019: Sold out; ≈ 2200 attendees
 ShmooCon XVI: January 31 – February 2, 2020; ≈ 2175 attendees
 ShmooCon XVII: March 24 – March 26, 2022; ≈ 2000 attendees

Research presented at ShmooCon
ShmooCon seeks to select talks that are original research and have not been presented at other conventions.

Charitable efforts
Every year ShmooCon supports multiple charities, such as the Electronic Frontier Foundation and Hackers for Charity, by sponsoring T-shirt sales. Attendees are provided the opportunity to donate a fixed amount of money for a charity in exchange for a T-shirt.

References

External links
 ShmooCon website
 
 ShmooCon "find a room" mailing list

Hacker conventions
Recurring events established in 2005